The Gui River (Chinese: 桂江) is a river in the Guangxi Zhuang Autonomous Region of China, and a tributary of the Xi Jiang. It is formed in Pingle by the confluence of the Li River and Lipu River and flows southeast, merging with the Xun Jiang to form the Xi at Wuzhou.

References

Rivers of Guangxi
Tributaries of the Pearl River (China)